Technological University (Kyaukse) is a university under the Ministry of Education. It is located at Kyaukse township, Mandalay Region, Myanmar. Government Technical Institute (Kyaukse) was initially opened on 9, December, 1998 at Myopet Street, Yesu Quarter in Kyaukse. The board of the government of Union of Myanmar upgraded it to the Government Technological College (Kyaukse) on 210, January, 2001 and then it to Technological University (Kyaukse) on 20, January, 2007.

Departments
Civil Engineering Department
Electronic and Communication Engineering Department
Electrical Power Engineering Department
Mechanical Power Engineering Department
Information Technology Department
Metallurgy  Engineering Department
Biotechnology Department
Nuclear Engineering Department

Programs
 Post Graduate Degree Program
 Graduate Degree Program
 Under Graduate Degree Program

See also
Mandalay Technological University
Technological University, Mandalay
Technological University, Meiktila
Technological University Yamethin
University of Technology, Yadanabon Cyber City
List of Technological Universities in Myanmar

External links

Technological universities in Myanmar